Olaf is a Scandinavian, German, and Dutch given name.

Olaf may also refer to:

 Olaf, Iowa, unincorporated community, US
 European Anti-Fraud Office (OLAF)
 OLAF (Organization to solve the foreigner question), a 2010 Swiss satire
 Tropical Storm Olaf, several storms
 Olaf (Frozen), a fictional character from Disney's Frozen franchise
 A variant of the letter Aleph

See also
 St. Olaf (disambiguation)
 Olave (disambiguation)
 Olavi
 Olavo